The Chauncey Street station is a local station on the BMT Jamaica Line of the New York City Subway. Located at the intersection of Chauncey Street and Broadway in Brooklyn, it is served by the Z train during rush hours in the peak direction and by the J at all other times.

Station layout

There are two side platforms and three tracks; the center express track is not used in regular service.

The 2002 artwork here is called El-Views by Maria Dominguez and it features scenes of neighborhood life.

Exits
The station has exits on both the west (railroad north) end and the east (railroad south) end of its platforms. However, and despite the station's name, the eastern exits to Chauncey Street are no longer open.

On the west end, each platform has a single staircase leading to an elevated station house beneath the tracks. It has a turnstile bank and token booth. Outside fare control, two staircases lead to both western corners of Rockaway Avenue and Broadway.

The eastern exits are now emergency exits leading to both the north and south sides of Broadway just west of Marion and Chauncey Streets. These exits were closed in the 1980s due to high crime. There is a closed station house around the intermediate level of the staircases.

References

External links 

 
 Station Reporter — J Train
 The Subway Nut — Chauncey Street Pictures 
 MTA's Arts For Transit — Chauncey Street (BMT Jamaica Line)
 Cooper Street and Rockaway Avenue entrance from Google Maps Street View
 Platforms from Google Maps Street View

BMT Jamaica Line stations
1885 establishments in New York (state)
New York City Subway stations in Brooklyn
Railway stations in the United States opened in 1885
Bushwick, Brooklyn
Bedford–Stuyvesant, Brooklyn